John Cairney Liddell (13 December 1933 – 16 March 1999) was a Scottish footballer, who played as a centre forward in the Football League.

References

External links
 

1933 births
1999 deaths
Scottish footballers
Footballers from Stirling
Association football forwards
St Johnstone F.C. players
Oldham Athletic A.F.C. players
Mossley A.F.C. players
Worcester City F.C. players
English Football League players
Cambuslang Rangers F.C. players
Scottish Football League players